In the Hebrew Bible and Christian Old Testament, Amos ( – ʿĀmōs) was one of the Twelve Minor Prophets. An older contemporary of Hosea and Isaiah, Amos was active c. 760–755 BCE during the rule of kings Jeroboam II of Israel and Uzziah of Judah. He was from the southern Kingdom of Judah but preached in the northern Kingdom of Israel. Amos wrote at a time of relative peace and prosperity but also of neglect of God's laws. He spoke against an increased disparity between the very wealthy and the very poor. His major themes of justice, God's omnipotence, and divine judgment became staples of prophecy. The Book of Amos is attributed to him.

Life

Before becoming a prophet, Amos was a sheep herder and a sycamore fig farmer. His prior professions and his claim "I am not a prophet nor a son of a prophet" indicates that Amos was not from the school of prophets, which Amos claims would qualify him as a true prophet. Amos' declaration marks a turning-point in the development of Old Testament prophecy. It is not mere chance that Hosea, Isaiah, Jeremiah, Ezekiel, and almost all of the prophets given significant coverage in the Hebrew Bible, give first of all the story of their special calling. All of them seek to protest against the suspicion that they are professional prophets, because the latter discredited themselves by flattering national vanities and ignoring the misdeeds of prominent men.

The Bible speaks of his prophecies concluding around 765 BC, two years before the earthquake that is spoken of in Amos 1:1, "...two years before the earthquake."  The prophet Zechariah was likely alluding to this same earthquake several centuries later: Zechariah 14:5, "And you shall flee as you fled from the earthquake in the days of Uzziah, King of Judah."

Though he came from the southern kingdom of Judah, Amos aimed his prophetic message at the northern kingdom of Israel, particularly the cities of Samaria and Bethel.

Jeroboam II (c. 781–741 BC), ruler of the Northern kingdom, had rapidly conquered Syria, Moab, and Ammon, and thereby extended his dominions from the source of the Orontes on the north to the Dead Sea on the south. The whole northern empire had enjoyed a long period of peace and security marked by a revival of artistic and commercial development. Social corruption and the oppression of the poor and helpless were prevalent. Others, carried away by the free association with heathen peoples which resulted from conquest or commercial contact, went so far as to fuse with the Lord's worship that of pagan deities.

Amos is the first of the prophets to write down the messages he has received. He has always been admired for the purity of his language, his beauty of diction, and his poetic art. In all these respects he is Isaiah's spiritual progenitor. What we know of Amos derives solely from the book that he himself authored. This makes it hard to know who the historical Amos truly was.

Amos felt himself called to preach in Bethel, where there was a royal sanctuary, and there to announce the fall of the reigning dynasty and of the northern kingdom. But he is denounced by the head priest Amaziah to King Jeroboam II and is advised to leave the kingdom. There is no reason to doubt that he was actually forced to leave the northern kingdom and to return to his native country. Being thus prevented from bringing his message to an end, and from reaching the ear of those to whom he was sent, he wrote instead. If they could not hear his messages, they could read them, and if his contemporaries refused to do so, following generations might still profit by them. No earlier instance of a literary prophet is known; but the example he gave was followed by others in an almost unbroken succession. It cannot be proved that Hosea knew the book of Amos, though there is no reason to doubt that he was acquainted with the latter's work and experiences. Cheyne concludes that Amos wrote the record of his prophetical work at Jerusalem, after his expulsion from the northern kingdom, and that he committed it to a circle of faithful followers residing there.

The apocryphal work The Lives of the Prophets records that Amos was killed by the son of Amaziah, priest of Bethel.  It further states that Amos had made his way back to his homeland before he died, and then was buried there.

Themes

God's omnipotence and divine judgment 
 No modern interpreter has denied that he taught that God is ethical to the extent that he cannot be affected by ceremonies as such. "For Amos ... religion consists not in ritual but in righteousness. YHWH, God of justice, demands right living not oblations."
 "Amos thus proclaimed an ethical God so clearly that only ethical relations between men could assure divine favor; and nothing in his words indicates that he recognized any other approach to God. Such an approach naturally involves worship – a term that includes the whole process of man's communion with his God; even in ancient Israel worship was never confined to sacrifices and offerings, as witness Jacob at Bethel, Moses before the burning bush, Elijah on Mt. Horeb. Man also has never failed to devise new forms of approach to God to accord with his changed conceptions of Deity."

Teachings
Some of his main teachings are:
 Prayers and sacrifices do not make up for bad deeds. "Practice of religious acts is no insurance against the judgment of God" and that "privilege involves opportunity, or escap-ism... Immunity cannot be claimed simply because of past favor of God, irrespective of deeds and the measure of faithful service."
 Behaving justly is much more important than ritual. "Ceremonial worship has no intrinsic value...the only genuine service of God consists in justice and righteousness (5:24)".
 Amos believed in economic justice, "the conviction of Amos that economic justice was necessary to preserve the nation (whereas his opponents asserted that sacrifices and offerings were preserving it) forced him to conclude that a God who wanted the nation preserved must want justice and want it always, and could never therefore want sacrifices,  which abetted and condoned injustice."
 "Amos was an uncompromising monotheist. There is not a verse in his writing that admits the existence of other deities."
 The relationship between the people of Israel is articulated to be a moral contract. If the people of Israel fall below the moral requirements of God, then their relationship will certainly be dissolved.
 Dependence on God is a requisite towards fulfillment. One will live if he seeks the Lord.

Justice 
Ancient interpretations

The ancient exhortation towards justice is expressed by the voice of God in Amos' teachings. Amos is told by God that the Israelites are going to face divine intervention as oppression was running rampant in Israel. God expressed this oppression by saying that the Israelites were practicing religiosity without righteousness. By oppressing the poor and failing to practice justice the Israelites were behaving unrighteously; justice was to be enacted as a core of God's message in Amos' prophetic teachings.

Modern interpretations

Influences of or references to Amos' teachings can be found in certain modern political and civil rights speeches. In Martin Luther King Jr.'s "I Have a Dream", King states "we will not be satisfied until justice rolls down like waters and righteousness like a mighty stream", which is an allusion to Amos 5:24: "But let justice roll on like a river, righteousness like a never-failing stream!". Bernie Sanders also referenced Amos 5:24 in a speech during his 2016 presidential campaign. It was used in a sub-tweet by James Comey after Michael Flynn pleaded guilty to lying to FBI agents during the ongoing Trump Russia scandal.

Feast days/religious veneration
Within Roman, Byzantine, and other high liturgical churches saints are regularly celebrated and venerated on Feast days throughout the calendar year. This practice honors Christian martyrs on the traditional day of their death with facts about their life and insights attributed to them meant to edify the faithful.

In the Eastern Orthodox liturgical calendar, Amos' feast day is celebrated on June 15 (for those churches which follow the traditional Julian Calendar, June 15 currently falls on June 28 of the modern Gregorian Calendar). He is commemorated along with the other minor prophets in the Calendar of Saints of the Armenian Apostolic Church on July 31.

In Catholic tradition Amos' day is celebrated on March 31.

In the Eastern Church the Troparion of Amos is sung:

"Celebrating the memory / Of Your Prophet Amos, O Lord, / For his sake, we entreat You, save our souls."

Reflecting Amos' sense of urgency and social justice, the Kontakion of Amos is sung:

"Purifying your fervent heart by the Spirit, / O glorious Prophet Amos, / And receiving the gift of prophecy from on high, / You cry with a loud voice to the nations: / This is our God, and there is none beside Him."

References

Sources

Further reading
 Anderson, Bernhard W. & Foster R. McCurley The Eighth Century Prophets: Amos, Hosea, Isaiah, Micah Wipf and Stock: 2003. 
 Anderson, Francis I. & David Noel Freedman, Amos, The Anchor Yale Bible, vol. 24A; New Haven: Yale University Press, 2008. 
 Rosenbaum, Stanley Ned Amos of Israel: A New Interpretation Georgia: Mercer University Press: 1990.

External links
The Holy Prophet Amos – Orthodox icon and synaxarion
Hypertext bible commentary: Amos

8th-century BC people
Christian saints from the Old Testament
People from Tuqu'
Ancient farmers
Book of Amos